John "Jack" McEvoy is a literary character created by Michael Connelly in the 1996 novel The Poet and starring again in the sequel the Scarecrow thirteen years later.  In the interim, McEvoy appeared in one Harry Bosch novel – 2001's A Darkness More Than Night – and one Mickey Haller novel – 2008's The Brass Verdict. McEvoy starred again in Connelly's 2020 novel Fair Warning.

Connelly describes his time writing about McEvoy as his "least favorable writing experience"  because "he is easily the most autobiographical character I have ever written about".

Fictional biography
Jack was born on May 21, 1961, the son of Millie and Tom McEvoy, the twin brother of Sean McEvoy, the younger brother of Sarah McEvoy (who died in 1976), and the brother-in-law of Riley McEvoy. He grew up in Colorado before going to college at the Medill School of Journalism in Evanston, Illinois. After college, he traveled to Paris, then returned to Colorado and took a position covering the murder beat for the Rocky Mountain News.

He moved to Los Angeles in the late-1990s and covered the crime beat for the Times.  While at the Times, he married and subsequently divorced fellow journalist Keisha Russell, who had previously appeared in Connelly's 1995 novel The Last Coyote. He later moved from the Times to work as an investigative journalist for Fair Warning, based on the real-life news service FairWarning.

List of appearances
 The Poet (1996)
 A Darkness More Than Night (2001)
 The Brass Verdict (2008)
 The Scarecrow (2009)
 Fair Warning (2020)

References

Book series introduced in 1996
Harry Bosch series
Fictional reporters
Fictional characters from Colorado
Michael Connelly characters
Literary characters introduced in 1996
Characters in American novels of the 20th century
Characters in American novels of the 21st century